Forzzaea leopoldo-horstii is a plant species in the genus Forzzaea. This species is endemic to Brazil.

References

Bromelioideae
Flora of Brazil